Margaret Vanessa Barrie (born 29 May 1996) is a Sierra Leonean sprinter. She competed in the women's 400 metres at the 2017 World Championships in Athletics. In 2019, she competed in the women's 200 metres and women's 4 × 400 metres relay at the 2019 African Games held in Rabat, Morocco.

Barrie was expecting to be entered into the 400 metres race at the 2020 Summer Games. However, an administrative error saw her entered into the 100 metres instead. She ran a season’s best time to come through the preliminary round and improved her season’s best again in the heat but didn’t proceed to the semi final.

References

External links
 
 
 
 Maggie Barrie at Ohio State Buckeyes

1996 births
Living people
Sierra Leonean female sprinters
World Athletics Championships athletes for Sierra Leone
Place of birth missing (living people)
Athletes (track and field) at the 2019 African Games
African Games competitors for Sierra Leone
Athletes (track and field) at the 2020 Summer Olympics
Olympic athletes of Sierra Leone
Ohio State Buckeyes women's track and field athletes
Olympic female sprinters